Fana Gymnas is a public high school located in Fana in Bergen, Norway. The school was founded in 1916 as a middle school, and the headmaster was the father of Nordahl Grieg. The school became a high school in 1935.

The school was known for their annual play, Fana Skoleteater, that has existed since 1938. The play had a break between 1972 and 1986 because of a discord between the students and the administration. Later the play was managed by students and former students.

Schools in Bergen
Educational institutions established in 1916
1916 establishments in Norway
Educational institutions disestablished in 2016
2016 disestablishments in Norway